The Place at the Coast is a 1987 Australian drama film directed by George Ogilvie and starring John Hargreaves. It is based on the novel of the same name by Jane Hyde.

Plot
Young Ellie McAdam's passion and shelter is the pristine landscape surrounding the village of Kilkee on the Australian east coast where she and her father Neil, an abstracted widower, spend peaceful holidays in a ramshackle beach house disrupted by visits from their obstreperous extended family. When Neil is blinded by the sudden rediscovery of love, Ellie finds herself isolated in her opposition to a development that will destroy the landscape forever.

Cast
John Hargreaves as Neil McAdam
Heather Mitchell as Margot Ryan
Tushka Bergen as Ellie McAdam
Julie Hamilton as Enid Burroughs
Aileen Britton as Gran
Willie Fennell as Fred Ryan
Michele Fawdon as Aunt Helen

Nominations
Australian Film Institute Awards

Australian Film Institute Award for Best Screenplay - Hilary Furlong
Australian Film Institute Award for Best Actress in a Supporting Role - Julie Hamilton
Australian Film Institute Award for Best Achievement in Production Design - Owen Paterson
Australian Film Institute Award for Best Costume Design - Anna French

References

External links
 
The Place at the Coast at Oz Movies
Review of film at SBS Movie Show

1987 films
Films based on Australian novels
Films shot in Australia
Films scored by Chris Neal (songwriter)
Australian drama films
Films set in the 1960s
1980s English-language films
1980s Australian films